1 November 1954 Stadium is a multi-use stadium in the El Harrach quarter of Algiers, Algeria.  It is used mostly for football matches and is the home ground of USM El Harrach.  The stadium holds 8,000 people.

The stadium is named for the date of the founding of the National Liberation Front, which obtained independence for Algeria from France.

References

External links
Stadium file - goalzz.com

1er Novembre
Sports venues in Algiers